The 2021 NC State Wolfpack baseball team represented North Carolina State University during the 2021 NCAA Division I baseball season. The Wolfpack played their home games at Doak Field as a member of the Atlantic Coast Conference. They were led by head coach Elliott Avent, who was in his 25th season at NC State.

Previous season
On March 12, 2020, due to the COVID-19 pandemic, NC State and the ACC announced the season was suspended. On March 17, 2020, the Atlantic Coast Conference announced all spring sports would be cancelled for the remainder of the season.

Personnel

Roster

Coaching Staff

Schedule

! style="" | Regular Season
|- valign="top" 

|- bgcolor="#bbbbbb"
| February 19 || * ||  || Doak Field • Raleigh, NC || canceled ||  ||  ||  ||  || – || –
|- bgcolor="#bbbbbb"
| February 20 || VMI* ||  || Doak Field • Raleigh, NC || canceled ||  ||  ||  ||  || – || –
|- bgcolor="#bbbbbb"
| February 21 || VMI* ||  || Doak Field • Raleigh, NC || canceled ||  ||  ||  ||  || – || –
|- bgcolor="#ddffdd"
| February 21 || Davidson* ||  || Doak Field • Raleigh, NC || W 13–3 || Johnston (1–0) || Fenton (0–1) || None || 198 || 1–0 || –
|- bgcolor="#ddffdd"
| February 21 || Davidson* ||  || Doak Field • Raleigh, NC || W 6–4 || Klyman (2–0) || Flynn (0–1) || None || 198 || 2–0 || –
|- bgcolor="#ffdddd"
| February 23 || * ||  || Doak Field • Raleigh, NC || L 13–16 || Stephens (1–0) || Klyman (1–1) || Robinson (2) || 198 || 2–1 || –
|- bgcolor="#ffdddd"
| February 26 || No. 15 Georgia Tech ||  || Doak Field • Raleigh, NC || L 2–9 || Hurter (1–0) || Justice (0–1) || None || 198 || 2–2 || 0–1
|- bgcolor="#ffdddd"
| February 27 || No. 15 Georgia Tech ||  || Doak Field • Raleigh, NC || L 3–8 || Smith (1–0) || Klyman (1–2) || Finley (1) || 198 || 2–3 || 0–2
|- bgcolor="#ffdddd"
| February 28 || No. 15 Georgia Tech ||  || Doak Field • Raleigh, NC || L 4–8 || King (1–0) || Villaman (0–1) || None || 327 || 2–4 || 0–3
|-

|- bgcolor="#ddffdd"
| March 2 || Campbell*  ||  || Doak Field • Raleigh, NC || W 14–6 || Willadsen (1–0) || Boxrucker (0–1) || None || 294 || 3–4 || 0–3
|- bgcolor="#ddffdd"
| March 5 || No. 9 Miami ||  || Doak Field • Raleigh, NC || W 11–5 || Justice (1–1) || Garland (0–1) || Johnston (1) || 346 || 4–4 || 1–3
|- bgcolor="#ffdddd"
| March 6 || No. 9 Miami ||  || Doak Field • Raleigh, NC || L 4–6 || Arguelles (2–0) || Silver (0–1) || Palmquist (3) || 361 || 4–5 || 1–4
|- bgcolor="#ffdddd"
| March 7 || No. 9 Miami ||  || Doak Field • Raleigh, NC || L 4–6 || Arguelles (3–0) || Villaman (0–2) || Palmquist (4) || 393 || 4–6 || 1–5
|- bgcolor="#bbbbbb"
| March 12 || at Duke ||  || Durham Bulls Athletic Park • Durham, NC || canceled ||  ||  ||  ||  || 4–6 || 1–5
|- bgcolor="#bbbbbb"
| March 13 || at Duke ||  || Durham Bulls Athletic Park • Durham, NC || canceled ||  ||  ||  ||  || 4–6 || 1–5
|- bgcolor="#bbbbbb"
| March 14 || at Duke ||  || Durham Bulls Athletic Park • Durham, NC || canceled ||  ||  ||  ||  || 4–6 || 1–5
|- bgcolor="#bbbbbb"
| March 16 || at Coastal Carolina* ||  || Springs Brooks Stadium • Conway, SC || canceled ||  ||  ||  ||  || 4–6 || 1–5
|- bgcolor="#ffdddd"
| March 19 || No. 8  ||  || Doak Field • Raleigh, NC || L 1–13 || Kirian (4–0) || Justice (1–2) || None || 346 || 4–7 || 1–6
|- bgcolor="#ffdddd"
| March 20 || No. 8 Louisville ||  || Doak Field • Raleigh, NC || L 3–6 || Albanese (3–0) || Highfill (0–1) || Corbett (3) || 353 || 4–8 || 1–7
|- bgcolor="#ffdddd"
| March 21 || No. 8 Louisville ||  || Doak Field • Raleigh, NC || L 3–8 || Elliott (2–1) || Feeney (0–1) || None || 304 || 4–9 || 1–8
|- bgcolor="#ddffdd"
| March 23 || at * ||  || Brooks Stadium • Wilmington, NC || W 5–3 || King (1–0) || Cota (0–1) || Villaman (1) || 492 || 5–9 || 1–8
|- bgcolor="#ddffdd"
| March 26 || at No. 24 North Carolina ||  || Boshamer Stadium • Chapel Hill, NC || W 9–2 || Johnston (1–0) || Love (4–1) || None || 850 || 6–9 || 2–8
|- bgcolor="#ddffdd"
| March 27 || at No. 24 North Carolina ||  || Boshamer Stadium • Chapel Hill, NC || W 6–1 || Highfill (0–1) || Alba (2–2) || None || 850 || 7–9 || 3–8
|- bgcolor="#ddffdd"
| March 28 || at No. 24 North Carolina ||  || Boshamer Stadium • Chapel Hill, NC || W 8–3 || Willadsen (1–0) || Sandy (1–1) || None || 850 || 8–9 || 4–8
|- bgcolor="#ddffdd"
| March 30 || at UNC-Greensboro* ||  || UNCG Baseball Stadium • Greensboro, NC || W 3–0 || Villaman (1–2) || King (0–3) || None || 311 || 9–9 || 4–8
|-

|- bgcolor="#ffdddd"
| April 2 || Clemson ||  || Doak Field • Raleigh, NC || L 6–10 || Clayton (4–0) || Johnston (2–1) || None || 362 || 9–10 || 4–9
|- bgcolor="#ffdddd"
| April 3 || Clemson ||  || Doak Field • Raleigh, NC || L 3–9 || Askew (1–0) || Highfill (1–2) || Gilbert (3) || 422 || 9–11 || 4–10
|- bgcolor="#ddffdd"
| April 4 || Clemson ||  || Doak Field • Raleigh, NC || W 9–5 || Justice (2–2) || Gilbert (1–2) || None || 360 || 10–11 || 5–10
|- bgcolor="#ddffdd"
| April 6 || Appalachian State* ||  || Doak Field • Raleigh, NC || W 13–2 || Villaman (2–2) || Martinez (3–4) || None || 365 || 11–11 || 5–10
|- bgcolor="#ddffdd"
| April 9 || at Boston College ||  || Eddie Pellagrini Diamond • Brighton, MA || W 20–5 || Johnston (3–1) || Mason (3–4) || None || 150 || 12–11 || 6–10
|- bgcolor="#ddffdd"
| April 10 || at Boston College||  || Eddie Pellagrini Diamond • Brighton, MA || W 5–4 || Highfill (2–2) || Walsh (1–3) || Justice (1) || 150 || 13–11 || 7–10
|- bgcolor="#ddffdd"
| April 11 || at Boston College||  || Eddie Pellagrini Diamond • Brighton, MA || W 7–0 || Willadsen (3–0) || Stiegler (1–2) || None || 150 || 14–11 || 8–10
|- bgcolor="#ddffdd"
| April 14 || * ||  || Doak Field • Raleigh, NC || W 10–4 || Villaman (3–2) || Meachem (0–6) || None || 332 || 15–11 || 8–10
|- bgcolor="#ffdddd"
| April 16 || No. 10 Notre Dame ||  || Frank Eck Stadium • South Bend, IN || L 2–3 || Kohlhepp (4–1) || Johnston (3–2) || None || 279 || 15–12 || 8–11
|- bgcolor="#ddffdd"
| April 17 || No. 10 Notre Dame ||  || Frank Eck Stadium • South Bend, IN || W 5–2 || Highfill (3–2) || Bertrand (3–1) || Justice (2) || 237 || 16–12 || 9–11
|- bgcolor="#ffdddd"
| April 18 || No. 10 Notre Dame ||  || Frank Eck Stadium • South Bend, IN || L 2–11 || Kohlhepp (5–1) || Willadsen (3–1) || Sheridan (3) || 188 || 16–13 || 9–12
|- bgcolor="#ddffdd"
| April 23 || No. 22 Virginia Tech ||  || Doak Field • Raleigh, NC || W 3–1 || Highfill (4–2) || Alford (1–3) || Justice (3) || 395 || 17–13 || 10–12
|- bgcolor="#ddffdd"
| April 24 || No. 22 Virginia Tech ||  || Doak Field • Raleigh, NC || W 11–3 || Johnston (4–2) || Simonelli (4–1) || None || 380 || 18–13 || 11–12
|- bgcolor="#ddffdd"
| April 25 || No. 22 Virginia Tech ||  || Doak Field • Raleigh, NC || W 7–6 || Justice (3–2) || Heard (3–3) || None || 481 || 19–13 || 12–12
|- bgcolor="#ddffdd"
| April 27 || at Appalachian State* ||  || Beaver Field at Jim and Bettie Smith Stadium • Boone, NC || W 7–3 || Villaman (4–2) || Tujetsch (0–3) || None || 220 || 20–13 || 12–12
|- bgcolor="#ddffdd"
| April 30 || at Wake Forest ||  || David F. Couch Ballpark • Winston-Salem, NC || W 13–7 || Feeney (1–1) || Oxford (0–1) || Justice (4) || 707 || 21–13 || 13–12
|-

|- bgcolor="#ffdddd"
| May 1 || at Wake Forest  ||  || David F. Couch Ballpark • Winston-Salem, NC || L 11–14 || Lowder (2–2) || Willadsen (3–2) || Adler (6) || 685 || 21–14 || 13–13
|- bgcolor="#ddffdd"
| May 2 || at Wake Forest ||  || David F. Couch Ballpark • Winston-Salem, NC || W 15–8 || Johnston (5–2) || Fleming (2–6) || None || 621 || 22–14 || 14–13
|- bgcolor="#bbbbbb"
| May 4 || Elon* ||  || Doak Field • Raleigh, NC || canceled ||  ||  ||  ||  || 22–14 || 14–13
|- bgcolor="#ddffdd"
| May 11 || UNC-Wilmington* ||  || Doak Field • Raleigh, NC || W 9–1 || Villaman (5–2) || Holjes (0–2) || None || 427 || 23–14 || 14–13
|- bgcolor="#ddffdd"
| May 14 || at No. 16 Pittsburgh ||  || Charles L. Cost Field • Pittsburgh, PA || W 3–2 || Johnston (6–2) || McKennitt (1–1) || Justice (5) || 210 || 24–14 || 15–13
|- bgcolor="#ddffdd"
| May 15 || at No. 16 Pittsburgh ||  || Charles L. Cost Field • Pittsburgh, PA || W 9–7 || Tillery (1–0) || Hansen (1–4) || Justice (6) || 210 || 25–14 || 16–13
|- bgcolor="#ddffdd"
| May 16 || at No. 16 Pittsburgh ||  || Charles L. Cost Field • Pittsburgh, PA || W 10–3 || Willadsen (4–2) || Corcoran (0–2) || None || 210 || 26–14 || 17–13
|- bgcolor="#ddffdd"
| May 20 || No. 16 Florida State ||  || Doak Field • Raleigh, NC || W 6–4 || Justice (4–2) || Perdue (1–2) || None || 1700 || 27–14 || 18–13
|- bgcolor="#ddffdd"
| May 21 || No. 16 Florida State ||  || Doak Field • Raleigh, NC || W 6–4 || Highfill (5–2) || Crowell (1–3) || Justice (7) || 1700 || 28–14 || 19–13
|- bgcolor="#ffdddd"
| May 22 || No. 16 Florida State ||  || Doak Field • Raleigh, NC || L 11–15 || Kwiatkowski (2–2) || Silver (0–2) || None || 1700 || 28–15 || 19–14
|-

|- 
! style="" | Postseason
|-

|- align="center" bgcolor="#ddffdd"
| May 27 || vs (10) Pittsburgh ||  || Truist Field • Charlotte, NC || W 3–2 || Johnston (7–2) || Gilbertson (6–5) || Justice (8) || 3,987 || 29–15 || 1–0
|- align="center" bgcolor="#ffdddd"
| May 28 || vs (6) North Carolina ||  || Truist Field • Charlotte, NC || L 6–9 || Love (8–4) || Tillery (1–1) || O'Brien (3) || 7,291 || 29–16 || 1–1
|- align="center" bgcolor="#ddffdd"
| May 29 || vs (2) Georgia Tech ||  || Truist Field • Charlotte, NC || W 8–1 || Highfill (6–2) || Grissom, Jr. (1–2) || Justice (9) || 4,960 || 30–16 || 2–1
|- align="center" bgcolor="#ffdddd"
| May 30 || vs (9) Duke ||  || Truist Field • Charlotte, NC || L 0–1 || Stinson (3–3) || Willadsen (4–3) || Johnson (7) || 7,162 || 30–17 || 2–2
|-

|- align="center" bgcolor="#ddffdd"
| June 4 || (3) Alabama ||  || J. C. Love Field at Pat Patterson Park • Ruston, LA || W 8–1 || Johnston (8–2) || Ras (7–5) || None || 1,075 || 31–17 || 1–0
|- align="center" bgcolor="#ddffdd"
| June 4 ||  Louisiana Tech ||  || J. C. Love Field at Pat Patterson Park • Ruston, LA || W 8–3 || Highfill (7–2) || Jennings (5–4) || Justice (10) || 2,817 || 32–17 || 2–0
|- align="center" bgcolor="#ddffdd"
| June 4 ||  Louisiana Tech ||  || J. C. Love Field at Pat Patterson Park • Ruston, LA || W 14–7 || Willadsen (5–3) || Martinez (4–1) || Villaman (2) || 2,513 || 33–17 || 3–0
|-

|- align="center" bgcolor="#ffdddd"
| June 11 || No. 1 Arkansas ||  || Baum–Walker Stadium • Fayetteville, AR || L 2–21 || Wicklander (7–1) || Johnston (8–3) || None || 11,084 || 33–18 || 3–1
|- align="center" bgcolor="#ddffdd"
| June 12 || No. 1 Arkansas||  || Baum–Walker Stadium • Fayetteville, AR || W 6–5 || Highfill (8–2) || Costeiu (8–3) || Justice (11) || 11,084 || 34–18 || 4–1
|- align="center" bgcolor="#ddffdd"
| June 13 || No. 1 Arkansas||  || Baum–Walker Stadium • Fayetteville, AR || W 3–2 || Justice (5–2) || Kopps (12–1) || None || 11,084 || 35–18 || 5–1
|-

|- align="center" bgcolor="#ddffdd"
| June 19 || No. 9 Stanford ||  || TD Ameritrade Park • Omaha, NE || W 10–4 || Johnston (9–3) || Beck (9–2) || Justice (12) || 22,193 || 36–18 || 6–1
|- align="center" bgcolor="#ddffdd"
| June 21 || No. 4 Vanderbilt ||  || TD Ameritrade Park • Omaha, NE || W 1–0 || Highfill (9–2) || Leiter (10–4) || Justice (13) || 23,712 || 37–18 || 7–1
|- align="center" bgcolor="#ffdddd"
| June 25 || No. 4 Vanderbilt ||  || TD Ameritrade Park • Omaha, NE || L 1–3 || Rocker (14–3) || Payne (0–1) || Murphy (9) || 20,738 || 37–19 || 7–2
|-

|- 
| style="font-size:88%" | All rankings from D1Baseball except for Super Regional and College World Series where national seeds are used instead.

Source:

Ruston Regional

Fayetteville Super Regional

College World Series

Ranking movements

2021 MLB draft

Notes

References

NC State Wolfpack
NC State Wolfpack baseball seasons
NC State Wolfpack
2021 NCAA Division I baseball tournament participants
College World Series seasons